KMON (560 AM) is a radio station broadcasting a classic country format. Licensed to Great Falls, Montana, United States, the station serves the Great Falls area. The station is currently owned by Townsquare Media and features programming from ABC News Radio and Compass Media Networks.

History
Prior to 1948, the then-unbuilt station had the call letters KMFR and was licensed to Sun River Broadcasting Company. After the station was licensed to Montana Farmer Broadcasting Corporation, that company requested a change in call letters to KMON. The request was approved by the Federal Communications Commission in February 1948.

References

External links

MON
Townsquare Media radio stations